Pallavi Sharda (born 5 March 1990) is an Australian actress of Indian descent, and a classical Indian Bharathanatyam dancer. Her film credits include Oscar nominated film Lion (2016), Bollywood films Begum Jaan (2017) and Hawaizaada (2015), and comedy Australian film Save Your Legs! (2012) and Les Norton,  Australian teleseries. She has worked in Hindi films like My Name Is Khan, Dus Tola, Besharam, Hawaizaada, and Begum Jaan.  In 2021, Sharda starred in Tom & Jerry. Her latest release is the 2022 rom-com Wedding Season with Suraj Sharma.

Early life 
Sharda was born in an Indian family in Perth, Western Australia to Hema Sharda, and Nalin Kant Sharda. Both her parents are IIT alumni and have PhDs in science and engineering. They migrated to Australia in the 1980s before she was born. Sharda came to Melbourne as a toddler where she grew up in the outer north-western suburbs. She went to school at Lowther Hall in Essendon where she obtained an academic scholarship and commenced her LLB and BA (Media & Communications) & Diploma in Modern Languages (French) at the University of Melbourne, at the age of 16 and graduated with honours. Sharda shifted base from Melbourne to Mumbai in 2010.

Career 
Sharda started her Bollywood career by playing a cameo in Karan Johar's My Name Is Khan (2010). In March 2010 Sharda was crowned Miss India Australia in Sydney. She next starred in the comedic-drama film, Dus Tola (2010) opposite acclaimed actor Manoj Bajpayee, in which she played the role of Geeta, a village dance teacher.  Sharda's performance was identified as the best element of the film by The Times of India. In 2011 and 2012 Sharda was the lead actress of the theatrical musical, Taj Express directed by Shruti Merchant and choreographed by Vaibhavi Merchant.

Sharda made her Australian film debut with comedy film Save Your Legs, which released on 28 February 2013. She then appeared in Abhinav Kashyap's Bollywood film Besharam. in which she portrayed a woman whose car is stolen by a petty thief. Sharda's next Bollywood venture, Hawaizaada, was released worldwide on 30 January 2015. Directed by Vibhu Puri and co-starring Ayushmann Khurrana and Mithun Chakraborty, the film is inspired by the true events of Shivkar Bapuji Talpade, who is believed to have flown an unmanned aircraft in 1895 Bombay. Sharda received critical acclaim for her portrayal of a courtesan dancer during the British Raj era in Mumbai.

Sharda joined Sony ESPN's team as their new face for the IPL 2016 Indian Premier League (IPL).

Sharda joined Dev Patel and Nicole Kidman in the Hollywood film Lion in 2016. Her next Bollywood film, Begum Jaan, released in April 2017. Sharda received critical acclaim for her portrayal of Gulabo, a sex worker in rural Punjab, at the time of Pakistan's partition from India.

Sharda played a leading role in ABC Australia's medical drama Pulse, her performance awarded her the "Rising Star" award by the Casting Guild of Australia. she played Georgie in the ABC-TV series Les Norton. Pallavi is currently starring in Beecham House, ITV's historical drama series directed by Gurinder Chadha and the ABC-TV comedy Retrograde.

Sharda is working on her first book, currently untitled, that explores her identity struggles as an Indian girl living in Australia. The book is set to be released next year.

Advocacy 
Sharda is on the board of advisers for e-Kutir, a social entrepreneurship company focused on improving the lives of Indians using the 'base of pyramid' model. Her focus areas are Sanitation and Mother and Child. Sharda is a regular keynote speaker on Asia Literacy in Australia, cross-cultural relations between India and Australia and women's empowerment in India. In 2015 she was appointed the "Queen of Moomba", Melbourne's largest community festival, alongside retired Australian cricketer Shane Warne.

Considered a distinguished alumna of the University of Melbourne, Pallavi has emerged as a multi-faceted leader in the conversation around Australian Arts and Culture. Pallavi has curated festivals like Melbourne’s White Night, been the Queen of Moomba with Spin King  Shane Warne and in 2019 Pallavi was named on the list of forty most influential Asian Australians at the inaugural Asian-Australian Leadership Summit.

Filmography

Film

Television

Awards and nominations

See also 
Zumba Dance Fitness Party
Indian Australians

References

External links 
 
 
 

Living people
1990 births
Actresses from Perth, Western Australia
Australian film actresses
Australian people of Punjabi descent
Australian people of Indian descent
Australian actresses of Indian descent
Australian expatriate actresses in India
Actresses in Hindi cinema
Melbourne Law School alumni
21st-century Australian actresses